Arizona is a Lucky Luke comic by Morris, it was the third album in the series and was printed by Dupuis in 1951 and in English by Cinebook in 2015. It contains two stories - Arizona 1880 and Lucky Luke contre Cigarette Cæsar.

Stories

Arizona 1880

Synopsis 
Two bandits attack a stagecoach. Lucky Luke immediately sets out on their trail. In the Nugget City saloon, he faces a tough guy, Big Belly, who cheats at cards. The fat man, defeated, runs away leaving a spur, proving that he would probably be one of the stagecoach's attackers. Lucky Luke follows him and arrives at a hut guarded by a sentinel of Mexican origin. Luke easily neutralizes him and then attacks the two men (including Big Belly) who held the stagecoach up. The fight is tough, but the two bandits end up defeating him and taking him prisoner. Immediately afterwards, Cheat, who appears to be the chief, betrays Big Belly and his Mexican accomplice and flees after having tied them up. Luke manages to break away thanks to Jolly Jumper and immediately sets off in pursuit of Cheat which he succeeds (not without difficulty) in capturing.

Characters 

 Big Belly: Bandit that features later in La Mine d'or de Dick Digger. One of the stagecoach robbers.
 Mestizo: Mexican accomplice of Big Belly. Also to be found in La Mine d'or de Dick Digger.
 Cheat: Chief of the Big Belly gang, which he ends up betraying.

Lucky Luke contre Cigarette Cæsar

Synopsis 
Lucky Luke sets off in pursuit of Cigarette Cæsar, who has just escaped from prison and who has crossed the Mexican border. Cigarette Cæsar is charged with, among other things, armed robbery and murder. In Mexico, the bandit is struggling to get rid of his pursuer who still manages to find him. However, he manages to arm himself and find an accomplice, a Mexican knife thrower. This one sends to Lucky Luke a message on the door of his room signed by Cigarette Cæsar. He gives him an appointment the next day at 5 am in the plaza where the settlement of accounts will take place. The next day, Lucky Luke goes to the plaza where bullfights take place. The competitors are particularly incompetent. Lucky Luke also enters the arena. Cigarette Cæsar takes the opportunity to shoot him in the back but Luke was careful to make himself a bulletproof. Unarmed, Cæsar is captured by Lucky Luke, who brings him back to the American border.

Characters 

 Cigarette Cæsar: Bandit escaped from prison. He is accused of numerous crimes, including armed robbery and murder. He flees to Mexico.

References

 Morris publications in Spirou BDoubliées

External links
 Lucky Luke official site album index 

Comics by Morris (cartoonist)
Lucky Luke albums
1951 graphic novels
Comics set in Arizona
Works originally published in Spirou (magazine)